The 4 x 400 metre relay at the 2005 World Championships in Athletics was held at the Helsinki Olympic Stadium on August 13 and August 14.

Medals

Qualifying
From the initial two heats the first three teams in each plus two fastest losers progressed through to the final.

All times shown are in seconds.
Q denotes automatic qualification.
q denotes fastest losers.
DNS denotes did not start.
DNF denotes did not finish.
AR denotes area record.
NR denotes national record.
PB denotes personal best.
SB denotes season's best.

Heat 1
 Bahamas (Nathaniel McKinney, Avard Moncur, Troy McIntosh, Andrae Williams) 2:59.73 Q (WL)
 Jamaica (Michael Blackwood, Sanjay Ayre,  Lansford Spence, Davian Clarke) 2:59.75 Q (SB)
 Poland (Piotr Klimczak, Marcin Marciniszyn, Robert Maćkowiak, Rafał Wieruszewski) 3:00.38 q (SB)
 Germany (Simon Kirch, Kamghe Gaba, Florian Seitz, Bastian Swillims) 3:03.17
 Sweden (Mattias Claesson, Jimisola Laursen, Johan Wissman, Thomas Nikitin) 3:03.62 (SB)
 Botswana (Obakeng Ngwigwa, California Molefe, Tshepho Kelaotswe, Masheto Gakologelwang) 3:06.39 (SB)

Heat 2
 United States (Miles Smith, Derrick Brew, LaShawn Merritt, Darold Williamson) 3:00.48 Q (SB)
 Trinidad and Tobago (Ato Modibo, Julieon Raeburn, Renny Quow, Damion Barry) 3:01.91 Q
 Russia (Dmitriy Forshev, Andrey Rudnitskiy, Andrey Polukeyev, Yevgeniy Lebedev) 3:02.05 q (SB)
 Ukraine (Oleksiy Rachkovsky, Andriy Tverdostup, Myhaylo Knysh, Vitaliy Dubonosov) 3:03.41 (SB)
 Spain (David Testa, David Canal, David Melo, Antonio Manuel Reina) 3:08.03
 Zimbabwe (Nelton Ndebele, Young Talkmore Nyongani, Brian Dzingai, Temba Ncube) 3:08.26 (SB)
 Japan (Yuzo Kanemaru, Kenji Narisako, Yoshihiro Horigome, Mitsuhiro Sato) DQ

Heat 3
 Great Britain (Robert Tobin, Martyn Rooney, Malachi Davis, Graham Hedman) 3:01.95 Q
 France (Leslie Djhone, Naman Keïta, Abderrahim El Haouzy, Marc Raquil) 3:02.86 Q
 Dominican Republic (Arismendi Peguero, Carlos Santa, Danis García, Antonio Side) 3:03.57 (SB)
 South Africa (Jan van der Merwe, Ockert Cilliers, Pieter de Villiers, L. J. van Zyl) 3:04.64 (SB)
 Nigeria (Saul Weigopwa, Musa Audu, Bolaji Lawal, Enefiok Udo Obong) 3:07.91 (SB)
 Saudi Arabia (Hamdan Odha Al-Bishi, Hadi Soua'an Al-Somaily, Hamed Hamadan Al-Bishi, Mohammed Al Salhi) DQ

Final
 United States (Andrew Rock, Derrick Brew, Darold Williamson, Jeremy Wariner) 2:56.91 (WL)
 Bahamas (Nathaniel McKinney, Avard Moncur, Andrae Williams, Chris Brown) 2:57.32 (NR)
 Jamaica (Sanjay Ayre, Brandon Simpson, Lansford Spence, Davian Clarke) 2:58.07 (SB)
 Great Britain (Timothy Benjamin, Martyn Rooney, Robert Tobin, Malachi Davis) 2:58.82 (SB)
 Poland (Marcin Marciniszyn, Robert Maćkowiak, Piotr Rysiukiewicz, Piotr Klimczak) 3:00.58
 France (Leslie Djhone, Naman Keïta, Abderrahim El Haouzy, Marc Raquil) 3:03.10
 Russia (Dmitriy Forshev, Andrey Rudnitskiy, Oleg Mishukov, Yevgeniy Lebedev) 3:03.20
 Trinidad and Tobago (Ato Modibo, Julieon Raeburn, Renny Quow, Damion Barry) DQ

External links
IAAF results, heats
IAAF results, final

Relay
Relays at the World Athletics Championships